Tor Hugo Wilhelm Wistrand (2 April 1895 – 26 February 1983) was a Swedish diplomat.

Career
Wistrand was born in Norrköping, Sweden, the son of accountant Hugo Wistrand and his wife Anna (née Lindwall). He received a Bachelor of Arts degree at Uppsala University in 1915 and a Candidate of Law degree in 1918. Wistrand enrolled in the same year in the École des Sciences Politiques and at the Faculty of Law of the University of Paris where he later received a Doctor of law degree in 1922 and became Lauréat de la Faculté de Droit the year after. Wistrand was honorary attaché in Bern in 1919, attaché at the Ministry for Foreign Affairs the same year and became acting administrative officer in 1920. He was then secretary to the delegation of Åland question at the League of Nations Federal Council meeting in London and Paris in 1920. Wistrand was assistant secretary of the Scandinavian ministerial meeting in Copenhagen the same year and the secretary to the Swedish delegation at the League of Nations First Assembly in Geneva the same year.

He was attaché in New York City in 1921, in Berlin the same year and attaché in Paris in 1922. Wistrand was acting second legation secretary in London in 1922 and became second legation secretary in 1925. He was administrative officer (second secretary) at the Swedish Foreign Ministry in 1926, second legation secretary in Berlin in 1929 and first legation secretary there in 1931. Wistrand then became first secretary at the Foreign Ministry in 1935 and first legation secretary in Tokyo in 1936. He was legation counsellor in Berlin in 1940 and the same in Washington, D.C. in 1941. Wistrand was Deputy Director at the Foreign Ministry in 1948 and Director (Utrikesråd) in 1949. He was ambassador to Beijing from 1952 to 1956 and also accredited to Bangkok as envoy extraordinaire and minister plenipotentiary from 1953 to 1956. Wistrand ended his diplomatic career by being ambassador in Brussels and in Luxembourg from 1956 to 1961. In 1969 Wistrand was awarded an honorary doctorate by Uppsala University.

Personal life
On 19 January 1928 he married Katharine Corbin Parsons (1905–1968), the daughter of William Usher Parsons (1873–1933) and Katharine (née Corbin) of 1 Lexington Avenue, New York City. The ceremony took place in the American Church in Paris. Katharine Corbin Parsons was the granddaughter of Lieutenant General Henry Clark Corbin. Wistrand and Corbin Parsons had two children; Sylvie (born 1928) and Philippa (born 1933). Wistrand was a resident of Châteauneuf-Grasse, France.

Awards and decorations
Wistrand's awards:
Commander First Class of the Order of the Polar Star
Knight of the Order of Vasa
Grand Cross of the Order of Leopold II
Grand Cross of the Order of the Oak Crown
Grand Cross of the Order of the Crown of Thailand
Commander First Class of the Order of the Dannebrog
Grand Officer of the Order of Merit of the Republic of Hungary
Third Class of the Order of the Sacred Treasure
Commander of the Order of Orange-Nassau
Commander of the Order of the German Eagle
Officer of the Order of Polonia Restituta

Bibliography

References

1895 births
1983 deaths
Ambassadors of Sweden to China
Ambassadors of Sweden to Thailand
Ambassadors of Sweden to Belgium
Ambassadors of Sweden to Luxembourg
Uppsala University alumni
People from Norrköping
Swedish expatriates in France
Commanders First Class of the Order of the Polar Star
Knights of the Order of Vasa